Zalman Chaim Bernstein (1926-1999; זלמן חיים ברנשטיין), originally known in his businesses as Sanford Bernstein, was an American billionaire businessman and philanthropist.

Biography
Zalman Bernstein was born to a Jewish family in Brooklyn, New York in 1926. At the age of eighteen, he joined the United States Navy and fought in the Second World War. He then received a bachelor's degree in economics from New York University, followed by a master's degree in economics from the Harvard Business School.

He worked as an economic advisor for the Marshall Plan. In 1967, he founded the investment management firm Sanford Bernstein.  When he first founded Sanford C. Bernstein, his brother Paul P. Bernstein was his sole partner.

Personal life
Bernstein married three times. He was survived by his third wife,  Mem Dryan Bernstein; and three children, Claude Bernstein, Leslie Bernstein Armstrong, and Rochel Leah Bernstein; and three stepchildren, Geoffrey Dryan, Suzanne Dryan Felson, and Jennifer Dryan Farkas. He died of lymphoma in 1999.

In the 1980s, he became an Orthodox Jew and dropped his English name, Sanford, for his Hebrew one, Zalman. He attended Lincoln Square Synagogue and became an intimate of its rabbi, Shlomo Riskin. In 1989, he made aliyah and moved to Israel. He also founded the Jewish organizations Avi Chai Foundation and Tikvah Fund, and he donated to the Shalem Center.

References

1926 births
1999 deaths
People from Brooklyn
New York University alumni
Harvard Business School alumni
American emigrants to Israel
American Orthodox Jews
Jewish American philanthropists
20th-century American businesspeople
20th-century American philanthropists
20th-century American Jews